The men's 3000 metres steeplechase at the 2010 African Championships in Athletics were held on July 30.

Results

External links
Results

3000
Steeplechase at the African Championships in Athletics